Phestilla lugubris is a species of sea slug, an aeolid nudibranch, a marine gastropod mollusk in the family Trinchesiidae.

Distribution
This species was described from the Philippines. It is widespread in the tropical Indo-Pacific region. Its main prey is coral genus Porites.

References

Trinchesiidae
Marine molluscs of Asia
Molluscs of the Indian Ocean
Molluscs of the Pacific Ocean
Marine fauna of Southeast Asia
Gastropods described in 1870